Andy Gibson (born 2 February 1969) is a Scottish former footballer, who played for  Stirling Albion, Aberdeen, Stockport County (on loan), Partick Thistle, Clyde, Forfar Athletic and Peterhead.

External links

1969 births
Living people
Scottish footballers
Association football midfielders
Stirling Albion F.C. players
Aberdeen F.C. players
Stockport County F.C. players
Partick Thistle F.C. players
Clyde F.C. players
Forfar Athletic F.C. players
Peterhead F.C. players
Scottish Football League players
Footballers from West Lothian
People from Dechmont